Elwood Evans (December 29, 1828 – January 28, 1898) was an attorney, politician, and historian from Washington Territory. He was the mayor of Olympia and served briefly as acting governor of the territory. He is known as the pioneer historian of the state of Washington.

References

Further reading 
 Territorial Librarians: Elwood Evans from Washington State Library

1828 births
1898 deaths
Mayors of places in Washington (state)
Historians of the American West